Wellington is a market town in rural Somerset, a county in the west of England, situated  south west of Taunton in the Somerset West and Taunton district, near the border with Devon, which runs along the Blackdown Hills to the south of the town. The town has a population of 14,549, which includes the residents of the parish of Wellington Without, and the villages of Tone and Tonedale.

Known as Weolingtun in the Anglo-Saxon period, its name had changed to Walintone by the time of the Domesday Book of 1086. Wellington became a town under a royal charter of 1215 and during the Middle Ages it grew as a centre for trade on the road from Bristol to Exeter. Major rebuilding took place following a fire in the town in 1731, after which it became a centre for cloth-making. It is possible that the fire referred to here was actually in Tiverton, Devon which has details of a major fire in the same year. Further information on a major fire in Wellington at this time cannot be found. 

In 1809, the Crown referenced Wellington when creating a viscountcy for the eventual Duke of Wellington, Arthur Wellesley, after his victory at the Battle of Talavera in the Peninsular War. When the title's name was being considered, Arthur's brother, Richard Wellesley, Earl of Mornington, found an available manor in the parish of Wellington, a name close to the family name. Richard oversaw the manor's purchase while Arthur commanded the army in Spain against the French. The Wellington Monument south of Wellington commemorates Arthur.

The Grand Western Canal reached the town in 1835 and then the Bristol and Exeter Railway in 1843. The town's own railway station survived until 1964. Wellington was home of Fox, Fowler and Company, which was the last commercial bank permitted to print their own sterling banknotes in England and Wales. In the 20th century closer links with Taunton meant that many of the residents of Wellington commuted there for work, and the M5 motorway enabled car journeys to be made more easily.

Local industries, which now include an aerosol factory and bed manufacturers, are celebrated at the Wellington Museum in Fore street. Wellington is home to the independent Wellington School, and state-funded Court Fields School. It is also home to a range of cultural, sporting and religious sites including the 15th century Church of St John the Baptist.

The capital city of New Zealand is named after Arthur Wellesley, 1st Duke of Wellington, being recognised as having some influence in the company that founded the New Zealand town. The New Zealand capital therefore takes its name ultimately from the English town of Wellington in Somerset.

History

In a grant of between 899 and 909 Edward the Elder gave the land then known as Weolingtun, which means "wealthy estate", along with West Buckland and Bishops Lydeard to Bishop Asser. This was in exchange for the monastery of Plympton in Devon. An alternative explanation for the origin of the name is "the settlement in the temple clearing". By the time of the Domesday Book of 1086, the name had changed to Walintone and the estate was owned by Gisa (Bishop of Wells). The parish of Wellington was part of the Kilmersdon Hundred,

A site at Longforth Farm near Tonedale has been identified as having Bronze Age occupation and, during excavations prior to the building of new homes, found to have been occupied by a 12th-14th century building with decorated floor tiles covering .

A royal charter of 1215 gave Wellington its status as a town, and during the medieval period it grew as a centre for trade on the road from Bristol to Exeter, being laid out with the church at the east end of town, in a similar manner to other towns of this era. In 1548, the manor was sold to Edward Seymour, 1st Duke of Somerset, but reverted to the control of the bishops after his execution. By the end of the 16th century it had come under the protection of John Popham (judge) and his descendants who built a manor house which was destroyed during the English Civil War.

Major rebuilding took place in the town following a fire in 1731. After this the town's importance grew as it became a centre for clothmaking across Somerset and Devon, its importance as trade centre enhanced by fires in Taunton and Tiverton. By the 1831 census, 258 people were recorded as cloth workers in Wellington.

Arthur Wellesley took the title of his Marquessate in 1809 from this town of Wellington. Nearby Wellington Hill boasts a large, spotlit obelisk to his honour. It was erected to celebrate the Duke of Wellington's victory at the Battle of Waterloo. The foundation stone was laid in 1817 on land belonging to the Duke but, owing to funding problems, the monument was not completed until 1854. It is now owned by the National Trust who announced plans to reclad the monument at a cost of £4 million in 2009. Wellington Town Hall, originally built as a market hall, was completed in 1833.

In the 18th century turnpikes arrived in the area and then in the 19th communications improved with the Grand Western Canal reaching the town in 1835. Wellington station was opened when the Bristol and Exeter Railway reached the town on 1 May 1843. It was a typical Brunel design but was rebuilt in 1932 when two loop lines were put in. This entailed the platforms being moved back to accommodate the widened lines. These platforms are clearly visible and a goods shed still stands on the east side of the line at the Taunton end of the station, although the station closed on 5 October 1964. Wellington was an important station as it stood at the foot of a steep incline. Banking locomotives were kept here, ready to assist heavy westbound trains up to Whiteball Tunnel.

In the 20th century closer links with Taunton meant that many of the residents of Wellington commuted there for work, and the M5 motorway, which opened in sections in the 1960s and 1970s, enabled car journeys to be made more easily.

Fox Fowler & Co. Bank

Thomas Fox started the Fox, Fowler and Company bank in Wellington which rapidly expanded and ran successfully, until it merged with Lloyds Bank in 1927. It was the last private bank in England to issue its own notes and they were legal tender until 1964. There are nine notes left in circulation. The British Museum have another example on display. The bank established its Head Office at the old family house in Fore Street, Wellington (today the Lloyds Bank branch) – they opened branches at Taunton, Bridgwater, Weston-super-Mare, Torrington, Bideford, Barnstaple, Ilfracombe and South Molton.

The original £5 Note is on display at Tone Dale House – one of the last nine and possible the only one left uncancelled.

Governance

Wellington has three tiers of local government at parish, district and county level. The present system dates from 1 April 1974 when the Local Government Act 1972 came into effect.

The lowest tier is Wellington Town Council, formed as a successor parish to Wellington Urban District Council in 1974. The town council has 15 councillors, and is headed by a town mayor. For elections of town councillors, the town is divided into four wards: Wellington East (returning 4 councillors), Wellington North (4), Rockwell Green (3) and Wellington West (4). The political composition of the council in November 2009 was Liberal Democrats 7, Conservative Party 5 and Labour Party 3. The town council provides purely local services. An area to the south of the town falls within the civil parish of Wellington Without.

The middle, or district, tier of administration is the non-metropolitan district of Somerset West and Taunton, which was established on 1 April 2019. The council is based in Taunton, and consists of 59 councillors. There are three electoral wards in Wellington (North, South and West). Five councillors are elected from wards in Wellington: two are Liberal Democrats, one Conservative, one Labour and one independent.

The upper tier is Somerset County Council. Also based in Taunton, the council has 58 councillors, each elected for a single-member electoral division. Most of the town comprises the Wellington electoral division, with part falling in the mainly rural division of Blackdown & Wellington East. They are represented by one Labour and one Liberal Democrat councillor. Somerset County Council is responsible for running the largest and most expensive local services such as education, social services, the library, roads, public transport, trading standards, waste disposal and strategic planning, although fire, police and ambulance services are provided jointly with other authorities through the Devon and Somerset Fire and Rescue Service, Avon and Somerset Constabulary and the South Western Ambulance Service.

For elections to the House of Commons of the Parliament of the United Kingdom, Wellington forms part of the Taunton Deane constituency. The constituency elects one Member of Parliament (MP) by the first past the post system of election. Following the review of parliamentary representation in Somerset in 2010, the Boundary Commission for England created a modified Taunton constituency with the name change Taunton Deane, to reflect the district name.

Geography

The town has many dependent villages including West Buckland, Langford Budville, Nynehead, Sampford Arundel and Sampford Moor. The formerly independent village of Rockwell Green, to the west of the town, has been incorporated into the town however there is still a green wedge of land in between them. Wellington Park was a gift from the Quaker Fox family to the town in 1903 as a memorial to the coronation of King Edward VII. The  gardens were laid out by F.W. Meyer, who included a rock garden which used 80 tons of limestone from Westleigh quarry near Burlescombe. It is Grade II listed on the English Heritage Register of Parks and Gardens of Special Historic Interest in England. It was restored at a cost of £412,827 which included a grant of £296,500 from the Heritage Lottery Fund Public Parks Initiative.

There are Local Nature Reserves at Wellington Basins on the western fringe of the town. It includes a small pond and boardwalk with a variety of wildlife habitats. The grassland, hedges and woodland are home to a varied flora and fauna including birds such as the grey wagtail, white-throated dipper and reed bunting. Five separate bat species have been recorded at the site. Swains Pond in the south of Wellington is another Local Nature Reserve, which used to be the site of orchards. It now includes a pond which provides a home for amphibians including the great crested newt, palmate newt and toads.

Climate
Wellington has an oceanic climate (Köppen climate classification Cfb).

Along with the rest of South West England, Wellington has a temperate climate which is generally wetter and milder than the rest of the country. Seasonal temperature variation is less extreme than most of the United Kingdom because of the adjacent sea temperatures. In the summer the Azores high pressure affects the south-west of England, however convective cloud sometimes forms inland, reducing the number of hours of sunshine. Annual sunshine rates are slightly less than the regional average of 1,600 hours. In December 1998 there were 20 days without sun recorded at Yeovilton. Most of the rainfall in the south-west is caused by Atlantic depressions or by convection. Most of the rainfall in autumn and winter is caused by the Atlantic depressions, which is when they are most active. In summer, a large proportion of the rainfall is caused by sun heating the ground leading to convection and to showers and thunderstorms. About 8–15 days of snowfall is typical. November to March have the highest mean wind speeds, and June to August have the lightest winds. The predominant wind direction is from the south-west.

Demography
The town has a population of 14,696. Large growth occurred during the 1970s when housing developments were built on the south side of the town. These were largely prompted by Wellington's proximity to Junction 26 of the M5 motorway.

Economy

Wellington's main industry was wool-making and in November 2009, Deborah Meaden, best known from Dragons' Den a BBC television programme, invested in the Fox Brothers' Mill which produces wool cloth for Savile Row, designers and clients around the world. The Fox family established the mill in 1772. The Tonedale mill complex includes two listed buildings, some of which were still being used until 2000. The Prince's Regeneration Trust have been supporting the Tone Mill Regeneration Partnership in attempting to preserve and regenerate the area with a mixed development for commercial and residential use. It is included in the Heritage at Risk Register produced by English Heritage.

The last Fox family house in Wellington Tone Dale House is still owned by Ben and Victoria Fox, Ben is the great-great-great-great-grandson of Thomas Fox. Tone Dale House (since 1996) is also now run as an events and hire venue, for house parties, anniversaries, weddings and corporate events.

Local industries are celebrated at the Wellington Museum in Fore Street. Wellington was home of Fox, Fowler and Company, which was the last commercial bank permitted to print their own sterling banknotes in England and Wales.

The town is still largely dependent on industry, along with the neighbouring towns Taunton and Bridgwater with manufacturing industries identified within the county economic strategy as key centres for further economic development, due to good transport links. Swallowfield plc benefited from the growth of own-brand products during the 1970s and now produces aerosol, cosmetic and toiletry products. It was founded in 1876 as Walter Gregory & Co Ltd who manufactured animal husbandry products. The company diversified and in 1950 produced the first commercial aerosols in the UK which were basically farm products, air fresheners and insecticides. Bed manufacturers Relyon employ some 400 people. The company started in 1858 as a wool merchant, Price Brothers and Co., but the business soon moved into manufacturing beds and in 1935 changed its name to Relyon Ltd. In 2001 it was acquired by Steinhoff International Holdings Ltd., a quoted South African group.

Transport

The town was served by Wellington railway station on the Bristol and Exeter Railway from 1 May 1843 until 5 October 1964. It was here that extra locomotives were attached to heavy trains to help them up the incline to Whiteball Tunnel on their way south. The railway from Penzance to London, and also to Bristol and the North, continue to pass through the town, but no trains stop. The nearest railway stations are Taunton and Tiverton Parkway. A campaign was started to reopen the railway station in 2009.

The town is close to junction 26 of the M5 motorway, which spent a year in the 1970s as a temporary terminal junction, whilst the motorway between junctions 26 and 27 was finished. The A38 is still a very important link to Taunton. Wellington is served twice daily by Berrys Coaches 'Superfast' service to and from London.

Education
Wellington is home to a public school, Wellington School. It was founded in 1837 as an all-boys school. A solitary day girl was allowed to join the Sixth Form in 1972 and the following year Wellington became co-educational. The school opened a new junior school in 2000, having previously only catered for pupils aged 10 and over. In December 2007, the school commissioned its new multi-purpose examination hall and English Department adjacent to its Sports Centre. Notable alumni of Wellington School include actor David Suchet, chef Keith Floyd and peer Lord Archer.

The main secondary school in the town is Court Fields School. The 11–16 school includes a sports complex, completed in early 2008.

Religious sites

Despite its small size, Wellington has historically been notable for its profusion of churches of many different denominations, including a Quaker meeting house, the Grade I listed, 15th century Church of St John the Baptist, which includes a monument to John Popham, and the Roman Catholic Church of St John Fisher which was built in 1606 as Popham's Almshouses and converted into a Roman Catholic church 1936. There was a Presbyterian Independent Church.

Culture

Wellington has its own amateur dramatic group, formed in the 1960s, called Wellington Arts Association, which holds productions both at Wellington Arts Centre and at the Wellesley Theatre. It includes the Genesis Youth Theatre Group, Operatic Society, Pantomime Group, Civic Players, Arcadians and the Spectrum Arts And Crafts. The Wellesley Cinema was built in 1937, in the Art Deco style. The auditorium seats 400 people on two levels and is run as an independent cinema.

Wellington and District Camera Club meets in the New Science Block, Wellington School.
The club is affiliated to the Western Counties Photographic Federation (W.C.P.F.) and also to Wellington Arts Association (W.A.A.).

The town has its own weekly newspaper, the Wellington Weekly News, which was first published in 1860. There is also a community website providing news and views about the town, Around Wellington.

The town is home to Wellington Silver Band, a four section brass band. The band can trace its origins to 1887, when it was formed from the volunteer band of the 2nd Battalion, Prince Albert's Somersetshire Light Infantry.

Wellington is twinned to the town of Immenstadt in Germany, the town of Lillebonne in France and Torres Vedras in Portugal.

Sport
Wellington Cricket Club have a ground off Courtland Road, and have two teams in the Somerset Cricket League. Wellington A.F.C. football Club was formed in 1892 and now play in the Western Football League.

Wellington Bowmen is an archery club formed in 2001. It uses facilities at the rugby club and at Court Fields School. The Rugby club itself was founded in 1874. The first team plays in the Western Counties West League.

The Grand National winning horse, Miinnehoma was prepared for his victory in the 1994 race by Martin Pipe at his Pond House Stables in the town.

Freedom of the Town
The following people and military units have received the Freedom of the Town of Wellington.

Military Units
 The Rifles: 10 January 2022.

References

External links

 The Somerset Urban Archaeological Survey: Wellington, by Clare Gathercole

 
Towns in Taunton Deane
Civil parishes in Somerset
Grand Western Canal